Kitasu Hill is a young, basaltic cinder cone on southwestern Swindle Island on the coast of the Canadian province of British Columbia. Kitasu Hill produced lava flows that extend to the north. It is the most prominent volcano of the Milbanke Sound Group.

See also
 Volcanism of Canada
 Volcanism of Western Canada
 List of volcanoes in Canada
 Klemtu, British Columbia (alternate name is Kitasoo)

References
 
 Kitasu Hill in the Canadian Mountain Encyclopedia
 Catalogue of Canadian volcanoes: Kitasu Hill

Further reading
 Landforms of British Columbia, p. 119, S. Holland, BC Govt 1976.

Cinder cones of British Columbia
North Coast of British Columbia
Holocene volcanoes
Monogenetic volcanoes
Range 3 Coast Land District